Chalet is a village situated nearby town of Daulatpur Chowk in GHANARI tehsil, Una district in Himachal Pradesh, India.

The nearby market government college, hospital and other government offices are at Daulatpur Chowk.

People of Chalet speak Punjabi. The dress of folks is Kurta-Paijama for men and Salwar-Kameej for the women. Most of its people are government employees, mainly in defense.

The people of Chalet mainly earn their livelihood through Agriculture. But now due to the nearby industrial areas like Gagret and AMB, it has some other sources of income also. Gagret has few industries like MBD, luminous, Mahindra, SuperMax, AMB has Sonalika Ltd.

Most of the people move out of town for professional education, resulting in a migration of people to cities for jobs and income. People are religious and quite simple in their approach.

The area is very much connected via Rail and Road whereby the nearest station daulatpur chowk railway station.

Villages in Una district